Articles related to waste management include:

A 
 Advanced Thermal Treatment
 Air Pollution Control
 Alternate Weekly Collections
 Animal By-Products Order
 Animal By-Products Regulations
 Anaerobic digestion
 Anaerobic Digestion & Biogas Association
 Approved Code of Practice
 As Low As Reasonably Practicable
 Asbestos Containing Material
 Associate Parliamentary Sustainable Resource Group
 Association for Organics Recycling
 Autoclave
 Automated Vacuum Collection
 Automotive Shredder Residue

B 
Best management practice for water pollution (BMP)
 Bioaccumulation
 Biodegradability prediction
 Biodegradation
 Biodrying
 Biogas
 Biogas powerplant
 Biomedical waste

C 
Carbon management
 Charity shop
 Chartered Institution of Wastes Management
 Composting
 Cruise ship
 Community service

D 
Dry cleaning

E 
Electronic waste

F 
Fomento de Construcciones y Contratas
 Furnace Bottom Ash

G 
Gasification
 Geographical Information System
 Global Alliance for Incinerator Alternatives
 Global warming
 Global Warming Potential
 Greater Manchester Waste Disposal Authority
 Green Investment Bank
 Greenhouse Gas

H 
Health & Safety Executive
 Healthcare Waste
 High Density Polyethylene
 High Impact Polystyrene
 High Level Waste
 High Temperature Incineration
 Household hazardous waste
 Household Waste Recycling Centre
 Hydrofluorocarbon

I 
ICE demolition protocol
 Incinerator Bottom Ash
 Industrial Emissions Directive
 Industrial waste
 Industrial wastewater treatment
 Industrialisation
 Integrated Product Policy
 Integrated Waste Management
 Intermediate Level Waste
 International Solid Waste Association
 In-vessel composting

J

K 
Kerbside collection

L 
Landfill
 List of solid waste treatment technologies
 List of waste water treatment technologies
 Litter

M 
 Materials recovery facility
 Mechanical biological treatment
 Mechanical heat treatment
 Medical waste
 Mobile incinerator
 Municipal solid waste

N 
 Nationally significant infrastructure project
 North London Waste Authority
 Not In My Back-Yard
 Nuclear Waste Policy Act

O 
Office of the Deputy Prime Minister
 Official Journal of the European Union
 Old Corrugated Containers
 Ozone Depleting Substance

P 
Packaging and labelling
 Paperless office
 Pay as you throw
 Pneumatic refuse conveying system
 Pollution
 Post-consumer waste
 Priority product
 Pyrolysis

Q 
Quality Protocol
 Quasi Autonomous Non-Governmental Organisation

R 
Radioactive waste
 Reduction
 Recycling
 Reuse

S 
Scottish Environment Protection Agency
 Secondary Recovered Fuel
 Sewage
 Sewage collection and disposal
 Sewage treatment
 Single-stream recycling
 Site Waste Management Plan
 South East London Combined Heat and Power 
 South London Waste Partnership
 Space debris
 Stable Non-Reactive Hazardous Wastes
 Sustainable Waste Management

T 
Thermal Recovery Facility
 Thermophilic Aerobic Digestion
 Transfer Loading Station
 Transfer of Undertakings (Protection of Employment)
 Tunnel composting

U 
Unitary Authority
 Upflow anaerobic sludge blanket digestion
 Used Beverage Can

V 
Vertical Composting Units

W 
Waste
 Waste collection
 Waste management
 Waste minimisation
 Water Environment Federation
 Water pollution
 Windrow composting

X 
X-Ray Fluorescence

Y

Z 
Zero Waste

See also 
 List of environment topics
 List of waste management acronyms
 List of waste management concepts
 List of waste treatment technologies
 List of waste water treatment technologies

External links 
 Chartered Institution of Wastes Management (UK)
 Environment Agency Waste Technology Data Centre (UK)
 International Solid Waste Association
 Juniper Mechanical Biological Treatment Report
 Solid Waste Association of North America
 U.S. Environmental Protection Agency (EPA)
 Water Environment Federation

Waste-related lists
Waste management
Waste management